The National Radio Television Foundation or EIRT was the Greek state broadcaster founded in 1970, during the junta. In 1975 it converted to ERT.

History
The EIRT was the fourth state body renovation of Greece and the first state TV operator in Greece. The first body renovation of Greece was the Service Radio Broadcast (DPE; ; /YRE) with the Radio Station of Athens (PLA; ; /RSA), founded by the Augustinian Diktaktory of Ioannis Metaxas, in 1938.

The second operator was Anonymous Company Radio Broadcasting (/AERE) with again the PLA established the Occupation. In 1945 he founded the National Radio Foundation (/EIR) with the Constituent Act 54/1945 "establishing the National Radio Foundation" whereby and brought to the ownership of all property of the former AERE, which was created in possession.

Establishment
On April 21, 1967, imposed the military junta and assumes command of the EIR and TED (Later YENED) Georgios Papadopoulos wants to create a second public broadcaster, to strengthen the propaganda of the dictatorship. Facilities EIR in Zappeio not sufficient and the period from 1968 to 1969 made the Broadcasting House. In 1970 inaugurated, and the same year the Papadopoulos government Junta established the National Radio-Television Foundation in the most permanent television station's former EIR and radio stations First, Second and Third Programme.

Role
The role of EIRT was broadcast nationwide information and entertain the Greek people. In fact, he was an instrument of the junta to get in the part of the Greek people. Not controlled by the military but by people of the junta.

After the junta: succession
After the fall of the junta, Constantine Karamanlis returned to EIRT. It continued its normal course until being replaced by the Hellenic Broadcasting Corporation, 1975.

Defunct television channels in Greece
 Television channels and stations established in 1970
 Television channels and stations disestablished in 1975
 Television in Greece
 Radio in Greece
Radio stations established in 1970
Radio stations disestablished in 1975